ANZAC Hill, at 608 meters (1995 feet), is located in Alice Springs, in the Northern Territory of Australia.

The Arrernte name of ANZAC Hill have been recorded as both Untyeyetwelye and Atnelkentyarliweke.

A popular walk in Alice Springs is along the Lions Walk to ANZAC Hill. This observation point gives panoramic views over the township of Alice Springs. ANZAC Hill is also a Geodetic Fundamental Point for Surveyors, and levels are taken from a marker on the hill.

History 
Behind the town of Alice Springs, in Central Australia stands ANZAC Hill. In 1932 The RSL club successfully chartered to have ANZAC Hill, the high school and the oval granted as ANZAC Reserve. Dedicated in 1934 to the ANZACS of World War I, Dawn services are held each year on ANZAC day here, at the memorial.

The Rev Harry Griffiths designed the Anzac Memorial, on top of ANZAC Hill, in 1933. This memorial was unveiled on Anzac Day 1934 and dedicated to Rev Griffiths by Dudley Adamson in 1934.
Rev Griffiths’ ashes were placed in the memorial, along with those of his wife, on 2 June 1987.

References 

Alice Springs
Australian military memorials
ANZAC (Australia)
Hills of Australia
Tourist attractions in Alice Springs